Heather Ann Wilson (born December 30, 1960) is the 11th President of the University of Texas at El Paso. She previously served as the 24th Secretary of the United States Air Force from 2017 through 2019. Wilson was the 12th president of the South Dakota School of Mines and Technology in Rapid City from 2013 to 2017, and she was the first female military veteran elected to a full term in Congress.

While Secretary of the Air Force, Wilson focused on restoring the readiness of the force which had declined after years of combat and budget constraints. She proposed and supported three straight years of double-digit budget increases for military space capability and publicly acknowledged that space is likely to be contested in any future conflict. Wilson also guided implementation of acquisition reform to reduce the time to get military capability to the warfighter and increase competition by making it easier for innovative companies to supply the Air Force. Wilson was honored by the Air Force, Army, Navy, and Department of Defense for her superior service upon her retirement.

While in the U.S. House of Representatives, Wilson focused on national security issues, serving on the United States House Permanent Select Committee on Intelligence and the United States House Committee on Armed Services. She also focused on health care, energy, manufacturing and trade, and telecommunications, serving on the United States House Committee on Energy and Commerce. She opted not to run for re-election in 2008 and sought the U.S. Senate seat of retiring Senator Pete Domenici but finished second in the Republican primary to Congressman Steve Pearce, who then lost the general election to Democrat Tom Udall. On March 7, 2011, she announced another run for Senate in 2012 to replace retiring Senator Jeff Bingaman, but lost the general election to Democrat Martin Heinrich, her successor in the House of Representatives.

In April 2013 she was selected to be president of the South Dakota School of Mines and Technology by the South Dakota Board of Regents. She was the eighteenth president, and first female president, of SD Mines. Upon the recommendation of Secretary of Defense James Mattis, on January 23, 2017, President Donald Trump announced that he would nominate Wilson as Secretary of the Air Force. The US Senate confirmed her nomination on May 8, 2017, and Mattis described her as “a leader for all seasons.” On March 8, 2019, Wilson said that she would resign as Secretary, effective May 31, 2019, in order to assume the office of President of the University of Texas at El Paso. On March 2, 2020, President Trump appointed Wilson to be a member of the National Science Board.

Early life and education 
Wilson was born on December 30, 1960, in Keene, New Hampshire, the daughter of Martha Lou, nurse, and George Douglas "Doug" Wilson, a commercial pilot and member of the Experimental Aircraft Association. Wilson grew up around aviation and hoped to become a pilot like her father and grandfather before her. Her paternal grandparents were born in Scotland. Her grandfather, George Gordon "Scotty" Wilson, flew for the Royal Air Force in World War I and emigrated to America in 1922 where he was a barnstormer and airport operator in the 1920s and 1930s. He served as a courier pilot during World War II and started the New Hampshire Civil Air Patrol where he was a Wing Commander. Her father started flying at age 13 and enlisted in the United States Air Force after high school.

The United States Air Force Academy began admitting women during Wilson's junior year at Keene High School (Keene, New Hampshire). She applied and was appointed to the Academy. At the Academy, she was the first woman to command basic training and the first woman Vice Wing Commander. She graduated in 1982 as a Distinguished Graduate (magna cum laude equivalent). Wilson earned a Rhodes Scholarship to study at the University of Oxford and continued her education at Jesus College, earning an M.Phil. and D.Phil. in international relations by 1985.

In 1990, Oxford University Press published her book, International Law and the Use of Force by National Liberation Movements, which won the 1988 Paul Reuter Prize of the International Committee of the Red Cross. The Paul Reuter Prize is awarded for a major work in the sphere of international humanitarian law. Wilson won the second Reuter prize ever awarded.

An Air Force officer for seven years, Wilson was a negotiator and political adviser to the U.S. Air Force in the United Kingdom, and a defense planning officer for NATO in Belgium, where her work included arms control negotiations.

Career

National Security Council 
Wilson served in the United States Air Force until 1989 when she was chosen to serve as director for European Defense Policy and Arms Control on the National Security Council staff, "the President's principal forum for considering national security and foreign policy matters with his senior national security advisors and cabinet officials. [. . .] The Council also serves as the President's principal arm for coordinating these policies among various government agencies."  She worked for Republican President George H. W. Bush.  Her principal responsibilities included guiding the U.S. position on the Conventional Forces in Europe (CFE) negotiations and NATO affairs during the period of the fall of the Berlin Wall and the collapse of the Warsaw Pact.

Keystone International 
After leaving government in 1991, Wilson founded Keystone International, Inc. in Albuquerque, New Mexico to promote business development in the United States and Russia.

Governor Johnson administration 
In 1995, Governor Gary Johnson appointed Wilson to be Cabinet Secretary of the New Mexico Children, Youth, and Families Department, a state-level agency with 2,000 employees and $200 million budget. During her tenure, Wilson lead efforts to reform child welfare laws, modernize the juvenile justice system, and improve early childhood education. This position led her to take an intense interest in Medicare and Medicaid and the ways in which the system can be improved to ensure the health of the American people and the American healthcare industry. Under her leadership, the department opened a juvenile work camp and a secure facility for young, non-violent offenders. It eliminated the wait for state-subsidized child care, revamped the foster care program and made adoptions faster. She also was an architect and the chief lobbyist for the governor's education agenda, including a law allowing charter schools, annual testing, and more budget authority for local school boards.

U.S. House of Representatives

Elections 
1998 special election
Five-term Republican Congressman Steven Schiff declared he would not run for re-election in February 1998 because of his battle with squamous cell carcinoma. Wilson resigned her cabinet post to enter the Republican primary. She won the support of Schiff and U.S. Senator Pete Domenici. Domenici called Wilson "the most brilliantly qualified House candidate anywhere in the country." After Congressman Schiff's death in March, a special election on June 23 was announced. Wilson won the Republican primary for the general election with 62 percent of the vote, "propelling her to a sizable win in the June 2 primary for the fall election against conservative state senator William F. Davis."

Three weeks after winning the primary, Wilson won the special election with 44 percent of the vote in a four-way race against Democratic state senator Phil Maloof, Green Party candidate Robert L. Anderson, and Libertarian Party candidation Bruce Bush. She was sworn into office on June 25, 1998, making her the first woman since Georgia Lusk in 1946, and the first Republican woman ever, to represent New Mexico.

The special election set a record for the infusion of party money. For the June 23 special election, Maloof spent $3.1 million, approximately $1.5 million of which came from the Maloof family fortune and $1 million from committees. Wilson received $1 million from various GOP committees and raised an additional $1.5 million herself.

The special election also raised awareness of a 1996 occurrence when Wilson had her family's foster parent records relocated to a more secure location. After completing an investigation, Former District Attorney Bob Schwartz confirmed that the file was intact, accessible to the Department, and had not been tampered with. It remained in the custody of the Department, available for any official use but unavailable to her other than through the process all foster parents must use to get access to their records. Wilson produced an affidavit from the Department's General Counsel that the file remained intact and unavailable to her for the duration of her time as Cabinet Secretary.

1998 general election
Less than five months later in the general election, Wilson faced Phil Maloof again. This time, she won a full term, defeating Maloof 48 percent to 41 percent. Maloof far outspent Wilson again, spending an additional $5 million to Wilson's $1.1 million, making it the most expensive House race in New Mexico's history.

2000
Wilson managed to defeat her Democratic opponent, former U.S. Attorney John J. Kelly, by five points.

2002
Wilson had a somewhat easier time in 2002, defeating State Senate President Pro Tem Richard M. Romero by 10 points.

2004
In 2004, Wilson faced Romero again. Outside spending on the election was the 15th highest of all House races that year, totaling $2,499,980. The National Republican Congressional Committee spent $1,085,956 in the race. The Democratic Congressional Campaign Committee spent $1,296,402.

Wilson and 66 other candidates received $10,000 donations from then-U.S. House Majority Leader Tom DeLay's Americans for a Republican Majority (ARMPAC) political action committee. ARMPAC filed termination papers with the Federal Election Commission on April 24, 2007. Wilson returned the $10,000 donation from ARMPAC.

During Wilson's reelection campaign in 2004, Romero ran advertisements that made the suggestion that her votes in Congress aided Osama bin Laden because she had voted against a bill to require the screening of cargo holds. Wilson's campaign countered with a policy ad stating Romero "voted against the death penalty for child molesters who murder their victims."

Wilson won the election by eight points.

2006
In the 2006 elections, Heather Wilson faced New Mexico Attorney General Patricia A. Madrid, and a poll taken from October 24–29 prior to the election by Reuters/Zogby showed Madrid leading Wilson 53–44. Wilson won the election by 875 (out of 211,000) votes, or 0.4%

Tenure 
Wilson was the first woman to represent New Mexico since Georgia Lusk in the 1940s. Wilson was a member of the Republican Main Street Partnership, a coalition of centrist Republican leaders. Wilson has appeared on HBO's Real Time with Bill Maher.

On October 10, 2002, together with 213 other Republicans and 81 Democrats, Wilson voted in favor of authorizing the use of military force against Iraq.

The Albuquerque Journal reported several instances in 2004 when Wilson acted in opposition to Republican interests: requiring the Bush administration to release cost figures for his prescription drug plan, criticizing Secretary of Defense Donald Rumsfeld about the failure to properly respond to violations of the Geneva Conventions during an Abu Ghraib hearing, and opposing a move by House Republicans to protect Tom DeLay from his fundraising scandal. While critics said these were calculated moves to moderate her image for her upcoming election, Wilson later lost her seat on the House Armed Services Committee due to the actions of Republican Joe Barton, an ally of DeLay.

Medicare Prescription Drug, Improvement, and Modernization Act of 2003 Motion to Recommit
In 2003, Wilson joined 221 Republicans and 1 Democrat in voting against a Motion to Recommit the Medicare Prescription Drug, Improvement, and Modernization Act of 2003 (HR 1). The motion would have deleted entire sections of the joint House and Senate compromise bill and replaced them with the respective Senate version.

Broadcast Decency Enforcement Act

On January 21, 2004, legislation was introduced by Congressman Fred Upton to increase the fines and penalties for violating the prohibitions against the broadcast of obscene, indecent, or profane language. On February 11, 2004, the United States House Energy Subcommittee on Telecommunications and the Internet held a hearing on the bill, at which representatives of the Federal Communications Commission, major broadcasting corporations, and the National Football League testified. During the hearing, Wilson denounced Karmazin saying, "You knew what you were doing. You knew what kind of entertainment you're selling, and you wanted us all to be abuzz, here in this room and on the playground in my kids' school, because it improves your ratings. It improves your market share, and it lines your pockets." The bill, H.R. 3717, passed the House of Representatives on March 26, 2004, by a vote of 391–22–1.

NSA warrantless domestic surveillance
On February 7, 2006, Wilson, while serving as Chairwoman of the House Intelligence Subcommittee on Technical and Tactical Intelligence, called for a full congressional inquiry into the NSA warrantless surveillance. Eric Lichtblau of The New York Times said that "the congresswoman's discomfort with the operation appears to reflect deepening fissures among Republicans over the program's legal basis and political liabilities." In an interview for the article, Wilson said, "The president has his duty to do, but I have mine too, and I feel strongly about that."

Terminated U.S. attorney

Wilson was accused of and later cleared of influencing the termination of a U.S. Attorney. In February 2007, former U.S. Attorney David Iglesias alleged that Wilson's competitive 2006 campaign for re-election to the House was a significant reason for his dismissal from the Justice Department. In a March 2007 statement, Wilson said an October call to Iglesias was to resolve an allegation of ethical impropriety made against Iglesias, which Iglesias denied. Iglesias never reported the contact, as he was required to do by DOJ rules. In July 2007, the United States House Committee on Ethics decided not to proceed with any investigation of Wilson. The Justice Department also did a review and the matter was thereafter closed.

Environmental record
Wilson was a member of the Republican Main Street Partnership, the chairs of which introduced legislation to make the United States Environmental Protection Agency (EPA) a cabinet department.

Wilson, along with 80 Democrats and 215 other Republicans, supported House passage of the conference report on the Healthy Forests Restoration Act, which opponents argued would "reduce and expedite environmental and judicial reviews of forest thinning projects.

Wilson, 36 Democrats, and 192 other Republicans supported House passage of the Threatened and Endangered Species Recovery Act of 2005, which would have amended and reauthorized the Endangered Species Act of 1973 to provide greater results conserving and recovering listed species, and for other purposes.

The League of Conservation Voters (LCV) Action Fund, the political advocacy group's Political Action Committee (PAC), named Wilson to its 2006 "Dirty Dozen" list of members of Congress targeted for defeat by the LCV in the 2006 elections. The LCVAF also issued a press release in which Wilson was criticized for voting against a $58 million fund for voluntary conservation measures in the state.

Committee assignments 
 United States House Committee on Energy and Commerce, 105th Congress (1997–1998) until her retirement after the 110th Congress (2007–2008).
 Subcommittee on Energy and Air Quality
 Subcommittee on Environment and Hazardous Materials
 Subcommittee on Health
 Subcommittee on Telecommunications and the Internet
 United States House Permanent Select Committee on Intelligence, 106th Congress (1999–2000), 109th Congress (2005–2006), and 110th Congress (2007–2008)
 Subcommittee on Technical and Tactical Intelligence (Chair & Ranking Member)
 Subcommittee on Oversight and Investigations
 United States House Committee on Armed Services, 107th Congress (2001–2002) and 108th Congress (2003–2004)

2008 U.S. Senate campaign 

Wilson was defeated in a June 3, 2008, primary against Congressman Steve Pearce by a margin of 51% to 49%. Wilson immediately endorsed Pearce's candidacy, saying that Republicans have "no time for disappointment or for bitterness. Republicans have made their choice and I gladly accept it." In the general election, Pearce was overwhelmingly defeated by Congressman Tom Udall, 61% to 39%.

2012 U.S. Senate campaign 

On November 6, 2012, incumbent Democratic U.S. Senator Jeff Bingaman decided to retire instead of running for reelection to a sixth term. Wilson won the Republican nomination to succeed him, and faced Democrat Martin Heinrich, who had succeeded Wilson in Congress. In the general election, Heinrich defeated Wilson 51% to 45%.

Academic career
Wilson served as President of the South Dakota School of Mines and Technology from 2013 to 2017, leaving to accept the appointment of Secretary of the Air Force. She returned to academia as the President of the University of Texas at El Paso following her resignation as Secretary of the Air Force.

Secretary of the Air Force

After being nominated by President Donald Trump on January 23, 2017, and confirmed by the U.S. Senate on May 8, 2017, Wilson became the first U.S. Air Force Academy graduate to be sworn in as Secretary of the Air Force on May 16, 2017.

As the 24th Secretary of the Air Force, she was responsible for the matters of the Air Force Department, including the organization, training, equipping and supplying 685,000 active, guard, reserve and civilian personnel and their families. She supervised the Air Force's yearly budget of more than $138 billion and leads strategy and policy development, risk management, weapons procurement, technology investments and human resources management within a global enterprise.

On March 8, 2019, Wilson announced she would resign from this position to be President of the University of Texas at El Paso.

Business career 
Wilson was the head of the consulting firm, Heather Wilson & Company after leaving Congress.

During her Senate campaign, the Department of Energy began a review of her contracts with national laboratories. In June 2013, a Department of Energy Inspector General report claimed that Wilson collected $450,000 from four Department of Energy facilities between January 2009 and March 2011. The report criticized the labs for maintaining unsatisfactory documentation on the work performed. The labs disagreed with the report.

Sandia Corp., one of the laboratories, reimbursed the federal government for the fees paid to Heather Wilson & Company. There was a settlement agreement with the Justice Department, and Wilson was not mentioned in that agreement. In addition, Wilson stated that she "was not a lobbyist for Sandia and [she] was not a member of the Contract Strategy Team criticized by the Inspector General's report."

Heather Wilson chairs the Women in Aviation Advisory Board to the Federal Aviation Administration (FAA) as well as the board of directors of Maxar Technologies.

Personal life 
Wilson is an instrument rated private pilot. She is married to Jay Hone, an attorney and retired Air National Guard Colonel. They have three adult children and one grandchild.

See also 
 Women in the United States House of Representatives

References

External links 

 Heather Wilson for Senate official campaign website
 
 
 House Eyes National Toxics Law Zachary Coile, SF Chronicle, July 13, 2006.
 Heather Wilson's comments during the hearing concerning the Super Bowl halftime show controversy YouTube clip of Heather Wilson at House FCC Hearing

|-

|-

|-

|-

|-

1960 births
20th-century American politicians
20th-century American women politicians
21st-century American politicians
21st-century American women politicians
Alumni of Jesus College, Oxford
American people of Scottish descent
American Rhodes Scholars
American United Methodists
Presidents of the University of Texas at El Paso
Candidates in the 2008 United States elections
Candidates in the 2012 United States elections
Dismissal of U.S. attorneys controversy
Female members of the United States House of Representatives
Women heads of universities and colleges
Living people
Military personnel from New Hampshire
People from Keene, New Hampshire
Republican Party members of the United States House of Representatives from New Mexico
South Dakota Republicans
South Dakota School of Mines and Technology people
State cabinet secretaries of New Mexico
United States Air Force Academy alumni
United States Air Force officers
United States National Security Council staffers
United States Secretaries of the Air Force
Women in New Mexico politics
Women in the United States Air Force